The Men's 1,500 metres event at the 2003 Pan American Games took place on Saturday August 9, 2003.

Medalists

Records

Results

See also
2003 World Championships in Athletics – Men's 1500 metres
Athletics at the 2004 Summer Olympics – Men's 1500 metres

References
Results
Records

1,500 metres, Men's
2003